Saint-Macaire is a commune in the Gironde department of south-western France. 

Saint-Macaire may also refer to:
 Saint-Macaire (grape), a name for the Merlot grape variety
 Gare de Saint-Macaire, a railway station on the Bordeaux–Sète line in France 
 Saint-Macaire-en-Mauges, a commune (to 2015) in the Maine-et-Loire department of western France
 Canton of Saint-Macaire-en-Mauges, an administrative division (since 2015) in Maine-et-Loire
 Saint-Macaire-du-Bois, a commune in the Maine-et-Loire department of western France